Min syster är en ängel (lit. My Sister Is an Angel) is a 1996 children's book by Ulf Stark. It won the 1996 August Prize in the "best children and youth book" category.

Plot
Ulf's sister died before she was born, and now she's an angel.

References

1996 children's books
Works by Ulf Stark
August Prize-winning works
Stockholm in fiction
Stillbirth